Navrangi Re! is an Indian Hindi-language television drama on urban sanitation broadcast by Colors rishtey. The show started going on air from February 2, 2019.

Cast
Aamir Ali as Vishwas
Vaishnavi Dhanraj as Chitralekha
Garima Jain as Maneka
Sushmita Mukherjee as Rajrani
Raju Kher
Manmohan Tiwari as K Seth
Kanan Malhotra as Vivek Oberoi
Anil Kapoor as himself
Anugrah Agnihotri as Dhaba wala

References

2019 Indian television series debuts
Hindi-language television shows
Indian drama television series
Colors Rishtey original programming
2019 Indian television series endings